is a passenger railway station  located in the town of Yazu, Yazu District, Tottori Prefecture, Japan. It is operated by the third sector company Wakasa Railway.

Lines
Only local trains stop at this station.

Station layout
The station consists of one ground-level side platform serving a single bi-directional track.  There is no station building, and a waiting area is placed on the platform.The station is unattended.

Adjacent stations

|-
!colspan=5|Wakasa Railway

History
Yazukōkōmae Station opened on October 1, 1996.

Passenger statistics
In fiscal 2018, the station was used by an average of 367 passengers daily.

Surrounding area
Tottori Prefectural Yazu High School
Yazu Town Koge Nishi Elementary School

See also
List of railway stations in Japan

References

External links 

Railway stations in Tottori Prefecture
Railway stations in Japan opened in 1956
Yazu, Tottori